A tactical air navigation system, commonly referred to by the acronym TACAN, is a navigation system used by military aircraft. It provides the user with bearing and distance (slant-range or hypotenuse) to a ground or ship-borne station. It is a more accurate version of the VOR/DME system that provides bearing and range information for civil aviation. The DME portion of the TACAN system is available for civil use; at VORTAC facilities where a VOR is combined with a TACAN, civil aircraft can receive VOR/DME readings. Aircraft equipped with TACAN avionics can use this system for en route navigation as well as non-precision approaches to landing fields. The Space Shuttle is one such vehicle that was designed to use TACAN navigation but later upgraded with GPS as a replacement.

The typical TACAN onboard user panel has control switches for setting the channel (corresponding to the desired surface station's assigned frequency), the operation mode for either transmit/receive (T/R, to get both bearing and range) or receive only (REC, to get bearing but not range). Capability was later upgraded to include an air-to-air mode (A/A) where two airborne users can get relative slant-range information. Depending on the installation, Air-to-Air mode may provide range, closure (relative velocity of the other unit), and bearing, though an air-to-air bearing is noticeably less precise than a ground-to-air bearing. A TACAN only equipped aircraft cannot receive bearing information from a VOR only station.

History

The TACAN navigation system is an evolution of radio transponder navigation systems that date back to the British Oboe system of World War II. In the United States, many companies were involved with the development of TACAN for military aircraft. Hoffman Laboratories Div. of the Hoffman Electronics Corp.–Military Products Division (now NavCom Defense Electronics) was a leader in developing the present TACAN system in the US starting in the late 1950s.

Operation
TACAN in general can be described as the military version of the VOR/DME system. It operates in the frequency band 960-1215 MHz. The bearing unit of TACAN is more accurate than a standard VOR since it makes use of a two-frequency principle, with 15 Hz and 135 Hz components, and because UHF transmissions are less prone to signal bending than VHF.

The distance measurement component of TACAN operates with the same specifications as civil DMEs. Therefore, to reduce the number of required stations, TACAN stations are frequently co-located with VOR facilities. These co-located stations are known as VORTACs. This is a station composed of a VOR for civil bearing information and a TACAN for military bearing information and military/civil distance measuring information. The TACAN transponder performs the function of a DME without the need for a separate co-located DME. Because the rotation of the antenna creates a large portion of the azimuth (bearing) signal, if the antenna fails, the azimuth component is no longer available and the TACAN downgrades to a DME only mode.

Accuracy

Theoretically a TACAN should provide a 9-fold increase in accuracy compared to a VOR, but operational use has shown only an approximate 3-fold increase.

Accuracy of the 135 Hz azimuth component is ±1° or ±63 m at 3.75 km. Accuracy of the DME portion must be  or 3 percent of slant range distance, whichever is greater, per FAA 9840.1 1982. and FAA N8200.121

TACAN stations can provide distance up to 390 nautical miles.

Modern TACANs are much more accurate. The requirement now is to have portable TACAN that is IFR certifiable, both station and portable systems. The latest modern version of TACAN has been tested and could be a feasible back-up to future Air traffic control systems and may even be integrated into systems for a seamless back up.

Past TACANs have relied on high output power (up to 10,000 watts) to ensure good signal in space to overcome nulls present in antenna design and to provide their required 200 mile range. With the advancement of technology, antenna design has improved with higher gain antennas, much shallower nulls, and lighter construction. Now it's feasible to have a 200 nmi range with a 400 watt TACAN DME transmitter, making the TACAN package much smaller, more portable and more reliable (a decrease in power also reduces heat, which lengthens the life of electronics).

On the first Space Shuttle flight, Capcom Joseph P. Allen reported up to the crew that their TACANs had locked onto the Channel 111 signals at St. Petersburg, FL at a range of 250 miles.

TACAN is getting smaller: full TACAN coverage can now be provided in a system that can be carried on a single trailer weighing less than 4000 lbs, and set up by two people in less than an hour. TACAN Transceivers can now be as small as lunch boxes (with full coverage and range) and the antennas can be reduced from 800 pounds to less than 100 pounds.

Benefits

Because the azimuth and range units are combined in one system it provides for simpler installation. Less space is required than a VOR because a VOR requires a large counterpoise and a fairly complex phased antenna system. A TACAN system theoretically might be placed on a building, a large truck, an airplane, or a ship, and be operational in a short period of time. An airborne TACAN receiver can be used in air-to-air mode, which allows two cooperating aircraft to find their relative bearings and distance.

Drawbacks
For military usage a primary drawback is lack of the ability to control emissions (EMCON) and stealth. Naval TACAN operations are designed so an aircraft can find the ship and land. There is no encryption involved, an enemy can simply use the range and bearing provided to attack a ship equipped with a TACAN. Some TACANs have the ability to employ a "Demand Only" mode wherein they will only transmit when interrogated by an aircraft on-channel. It is likely that TACAN will be replaced with a differential GPS system similar to the Local Area Augmentation System called JPALS. The Joint Precision Approach and Landing System has a low probability of intercept to prevent enemy detection and an aircraft carrier version can be used for autoland operations.

Some systems used in the United States modulate the transmitted signal by using a 900 RPM rotating antenna. Since this antenna is fairly large and must rotate 24 hours a day, it can cause reliability issues. Modern systems have antennas that use electronic rotation (instead of mechanical rotation) with no moving parts.

See also
Battle of Lima Site 85 (SAC TACAN captured March 1968)
Distance measuring equipment
Electronics technician
Global Positioning System
VHF omnidirectional range
Wide Area Augmentation System

References

External links

dB Systems, Inc. - Manufacturer of mechanically scanned, electronically scanned, shipboard, man-portable, and tactical TACAN Antennas - Complete TACAN Antenna profile with datasheets and photos
Rantec Microwave Systems - Manufacturer of non-rotating TACAN antennas - Complete with antenna internal photos and specs
Moog Navigation and Surveillance Systems - Fixed site, shipboard, mobile and man-portable TACAN systems
Leonardo Air Traffic Management - Fixed site TACAN systems

Avionics
Radio navigation
Aircraft instruments
Air navigation